Güilá Zapotec (Zapoteco de San Pablo Güilá, Zapoteco de San Dionisio Ocotepec) is a Zapotec language of Oaxaca, Mexico. It is spoken in the town of San Pablo Güilá, Tlacolula District, Oaxaca, Mexico.

A closely related but not identical form of Zapotec is spoken in the adjacent town of San Dionisio Ocotepec.

References

Sources
Arellanes, Francisco. 2009. El sistema fonológico y las propriedades fonéticas del zapoteco de San Pablo Güilá. Descripción y análisis formal. Tesis doctoral. Colegio de México.
 Broadwell, George A. 2001. "Optimal order and pied-piping in San Dionicio Zapotec." In Peter Sells, ed. Formal and Empirical Issues in Optimality Theoretic Syntax, pp. 197–123. Stanford: CSLI Publications.
 Broadwell, George A. 2005. The morphology of Zapotec pronominal clitics.in Rosemary Beam de Azcona and Mary Paster, eds. Survey of California and Other Indian Languages, Report 13: Conference on Otomanguean and Oaxacan Languages, pp. 15–35. University of California at Berkeley.
 Broadwell, George Aaron and Luisa Martinez. 2014. Online dictionary of San Dionisio Ocotepec Zapotec
López Crus, Ausencia. 1997. Morfología verbal de San Pablo Güilá.  Thesis. Escuela Nacional de Antropologia e Historia. Mexico City.

External links 
 MesoAmerican Language Collection of George Aaron Broadwell at the Archive of the Indigenous Languages of Latin America, including recordings and transcripts of a native speaker of San Dionisio Ocotepec Zapotec. 

Zapotec languages